Lacuzon ("disturbance") or Claude Prost (June 17, 1607 – December 21, 1681) was a Franc-Comtois leader.

He was born at Longchaumois (département of Jura).

He gained his first military experience when the French invaded Burgundy in 1636, harrying the French troops from the castles of Montaigu and Saint-Laurent-la-Roche, and devastating the frontier districts of Bresse and Bugey with fire and sword (1640–1642). In the first invasion of Franche-Comté by Louis XIV in 1668 Lacuzon was unable to make any effective resistance, but he played an important part in Louis' second invasion.

In 1673 he defended Salins for some time; after the capitulation of the town he took refuge in Italy. He died at Milan on December 21, 1681.

References

1607 births
1681 deaths
People from Jura (department)